Ante Čedo Martinić (27 January 1960 – 27 December 2011) was a Croatian actor.

Filmography

Television roles 
 Ruža vjetrova as Anić (2011)
 Loza as Bilić (2011)
 Bitange i princeze (2010)
 Ponos Ratkajevih as Ante Pavelić (2008)
 Ne daj se, Nina as Viktor Glowatzky (2007–2008)
 Cimmer fraj as Riko Balota (2007)
 Odmori se, zaslužio si as Marijan Bajs (2006–2010)
 Villa Maria as Maksimilijan "Max" Lovrek (2004–2005)
 Novo doba as Mile Pavičić (2002)

Movie roles 
 Iza stakla as Ljerka's husband (2008)
 Trešeta as Don Ivan (2006)
 Četverored as Ante Moskov (1999)
 Da mi je biti morski pas as waiter (1999)
 Kanjon opasnih igara (1998)
 Haloa - praznik kurvi (1988)
 Vanbračna putovanja (1988)
 Marjuča ili smrt (1987)

References

External links

1960 births
2011 deaths
20th-century Croatian male actors
Croatian male stage actors
Croatian male television actors
Croatian male film actors
Deaths from stomach cancer
Deaths from cancer in Croatia
21st-century Croatian male actors